Svetlana Buraga (born 4 September 1965 in Minsk, Belarusian SSR) is a retired Belarusian heptathlete.

Achievements

External links

1965 births
Living people
Belarusian heptathletes
Belarusian female hurdlers
Soviet heptathletes
Athletes (track and field) at the 1988 Summer Olympics
Olympic athletes of the Soviet Union
World Athletics Championships medalists
Athletes from Minsk